The Flying Winemaker is an international wine and travel show that premiered in September 2014 on TLC Asia. The program is hosted by Australian winemaker Eddie McDougall. The show focuses on the way food and wine is consumed and enjoyed across Asia. Eddie sheds the light on unorthodox and unique methods for growing quality grapes in new environments and teach local communities the secrets to pairing wines with local dishes. From markets and food stalls to restaurants and even in people’s homes, Eddie reveals combinations that can be replicated in kitchens around the globe.
 
The show takes place in China, India, Thailand, Japan, Taiwan, Vietnam, Bali and Australia in search of unique wine production and top-class varieties that the world has yet to discover.

Seasons

Season 1

Season 1 features 13 episodes and covers wine destinations in Asia & Australia. First aired in September 2014 running through to December 2014. Shown regionally on TLC Asia. Clips of the show are also available on the youtube channel: The Flying Winemaker

Episode Guide

Season 2
A second season of the series has yet to be announced. Filming is to take place in 2017.

References

TLC (TV network) original programming
2014 Hong Kong television series debuts